Jason Steele is a South African wrestler, bodybuilder and actor.

Early career

Bodybuilding

In 1997 at his first bodybuilding contest, competing at a weight of 110 lbs in the junior under 18 division, placing dead last. Steele returned in 1998 to the same show as the year before, this time a full 77 lbs heavier than the previous year winning the junior division.

In 2000 Steele won the junior nationals. He returned in 2003 now competing as a senior, winning the super heavy weight class, this was his last contest until 2014.
In 2014 Steele qualified for IFBB Nationals, by winning the super heavyweight division at the provincial championships.

This was the first ever first Senior Nationals, Steele took third place in the super heavies in his first outing at national level.

Powertlifting (2000-2004)
In 2003 Steele competed at the National Bench Press championships, he broke the junior national record with a 565 lbs press, and In 2009 pressed 506 lbs raw at a regional event.

Professional Wrestling Career (2005-2011)

Steele performed for World Wrestling Professionals in 2005 during the first season of WWP Thunderstrike, wrestling as The Gatekeeper.

In 2005 Steele traveled to the United States of America and wrestled for various independent promotions, including the Houston-based promotion Pro Wrestling Alliance which was promoted by Booker T. He used the moniker Jason The Terror and was one-half of The South African Connection with Ananzi. On June 29, 2007, they were defeated by Gabe Hollier and Surfin Surge in PWA Tag Team Qualifying match. On July 21, 2007, they were beat by The Trump Twins in a PWA Tag Team Tournament Semifinals match.

PWA

Steele along with Ananzi trained at the Houston-based PWA run by multiple world champion Booker T, Steele and Ananzi created a tag team and entered the PWA tag team championships, matched against Gabe Hollier and Surfin Surge as well as the Trumps established the pair as a heal faction.

WWP

Jason Steele made his debut on WWP Thunderstrike on SABC 2 in late 2008, he had feuds with Angelico and Justin Gabriel, he ended the series as one of the top-rated wrestlers in South Africa history.

2009 and 2010 saw Steele wrestle for Colors TV in India on 100% De Dana Dan, he was positioned as the faction heel and antagonist to the Indian wrestlers, Steele dominated the show with notable matches against Sando Paaiji and Murat Bosporus, and was seen as a staple of the show, he appeared on a 2009 version of India Has Got Talent with Tornado to promote the newly formed wrestling show.

Film/Television career 
In 2016, Steele signed with his talent agent Sean Fernandez, based in Toronto Ontario, gaining various commercial roles during that year. In 2017, Steele has been cast for a Marvel film as well as a Netflix series.

In addition to wrestling and film, Steele has done commercial and music video work. He was shown in a commercial promoting 2010 Soccer World Cup in 2010, where he and a team of musclemen played a soccer game against other typically South African steotypes.

Filmography

Film

Television

References

South African male professional wrestlers
Male bodybuilders
Living people
Year of birth missing (living people)